Morris the Cat is the advertising mascot for 9Lives brand cat food, appearing on its packaging and in many of its television commercials since the 1970s.

Description

A large orange tabby tomcat, the character of Morris the Cat is "the world's most finicky cat", eating only 9Lives cat food and making this preference clear with humorously sardonic voice-over comments when offered other brands. Every can of 9Lives features Morris' "signature". Three different cats have played Morris the Cat.

The original Morris was discovered in 1968, at the Hinsdale Humane Society, a Chicago-area animal shelter, by professional animal handler Bob Martwick. An invention of the Leo Burnett advertising company where Martwick worked, Morris was featured in 58 television commercials which aired from 1969 to 1978. John Erwin provided the voice-over for the cat. Morris won two PATSY Awards (an award for animal performers in film and television) in 1972 and 1973. The original Morris died on July 7, 1978 in his native Chicago of old age.

All cats to play Morris have been rescue animals, either from an animal shelter or a cat rescue. After receiving multiple contacts from individuals who claimed that they were the original owner of Morris, Bob Martwick chose not to reveal which shelter he obtained the second Morris from. After a yearlong search, Martwick selected the second Morris, who began appearing in commercials in 1979. The first two cats to play Morris lived with Martwick as pets. Morris's popularity continued into the 1980s, with the Leo Burnett Company orchestrating a mock presidential campaign for Morris in 1988.

The current Morris lives in Los Angeles with his handler, Rose Ordile. The Leo Burnett Company parted ways with 9Lives' corporate parent Heinz in 1994.

Other appearances
Morris has appeared in other media over the years. He debuted in the Robert Altman film The Long Goodbye with Elliott Gould, and starred in the movie Shamus with Burt Reynolds and Dyan Cannon in 1973.

Morris also appears as a "spokescat" promoting responsible pet ownership, pet health and pet adoptions through animal shelters. To this end, he has "authored" three books: The Morris Approach, The Morris Method and The Morris Prescription. He was quoted at the 1993 "end of year" edition of People magazine which noted deaths of 1993 to which he quoted a simple "Meow" in honor of the death of his friend, fellow advertising mascot, the dog Spuds MacKenzie.

In 2006, Morris was depicted as adopting a kitten, Li'l Mo, from a Los Angeles animal shelter, representing the first adoptee in a campaign known as Morris' Million Cat Rescue.

British advertising
When he first appeared in British television advertisements in the late 1970s, he was coincidentally voiced by Johnny Morris (then famous in the UK for his anthropomorphic character portrayals in the series Animal Magic), which led many British viewers, unaware of the character's origins, to wrongly suppose that the cat had been named after Morris himself. British ads for 9Lives later featured the voice of Richard Briers.

See also
 List of individual cats

References

External links
Hinsdale Humane Society - About Morris the Cat

Animal actors
Male characters in advertising
Food advertising characters
Cat mascots
Hinsdale, Illinois
Mascots introduced in 1968